The Church of St. Luke, High Orchard, Gloucester, was a Church of England church built and endowed by the reverend Samuel Lysons, rector of Rodmarton, who was also the first minister.

History
The church was designed by the architect Thomas Fulljames of Gloucester in what The Gentleman's Magazine described as "a neat structure in the later style of Early English". It was consecrated in 1841.

The first minister was Samuel Lysons, rector of Rodmarton. He resigned in 1866.

The curate in 1846 was Lewis Alexander Beck.

St Luke's was demolished in 1934 and stained glass from the building, much of it German or Dutch of the 15th to the 18th centuries, was reused at Holy Trinity Church, Longlevens.

References

External links 

http://churchdb.gukutils.org.uk/GLS252.php

Churches completed in 1841
19th-century Church of England church buildings
Church of England church buildings in Gloucester
Buildings and structures demolished in 1934
Demolished churches in England
Thomas Fulljames buildings
Lysons family